Sibyls were oracular women believed to possess prophetic powers in ancient Greece.

Sybil or Sibyl may also refer to:

Films
 Sybil (1921 film)
 Sybil (1976 film), a film starring Sally Field
 Sybil (2007 film), a remake of the 1976 film starring Tammy Blanchard and Jessica Lange
 Sibyl (2019 film), a French comedy-drama film

Literature
 Sybil (novel) or The Two Nations, an 1845 novel by Benjamin Disraeli
 Sybil (Schreiber book), a book by Flora Rheta Schreiber about Shirley Ardell Mason, an alleged sufferer from multiple personality disorder
 Sybil, a 1952 novel by Louis Auchincloss
 The Sybil or Sibyllan, a 1956 Swedish novel by Pär Lagerkvist
 The Sybil, an American dress reform periodical founded by Lydia Sayer Hasbrouck

Music
Sybil (album), a 1989 album by American singer Sybil
Sybil (operetta) adaptation of Szibill by Victor Jacobi
Sibyl Vane (band), indie rock band from Pau, France created in 2002

Geography
Sybil Island, one of the many uninhabited Canadian arctic islands in Qikiqtaaluk Region, Nunavut
Sybil rock, outcropping of rock on the site of Delphi, Greece
4679 Sybil, minor planet (12 km diameter) discovered in 1990 by R. H. McNaught
Typhoon Sibyl (1992)
Typhoon Sibyl (1995)

People
Sybil (singer), or Sybil Lynch, American singer
Sibyl of Armenia (died 1290), the princess of Antioch and countess of Tripoli
Sibyl of Burgundy (1126–1150), Queen Consort of Sicily
Sibyl of Falaise, kinswoman of King Henry I of England
Sibyl de Neufmarché (1100–1143), Countess of Hereford, suo jure Lady of Brecknock, Cambro-Norman noblewoman
Sybil (wife of Pain fitzJohn) (12th century), wife of Pain fitzJohn and Josce de Dinan
Sybil (given name)

Ships
HMS Sibyl (1779), 28-gun Enterprise-class sixth-rate frigate of the Royal Navy
, a Uganda Railway Lake Victoria ferry scuttled in 1967
HMS Sibyl (P217), an S class submarine
HMS Sibyl (R15), C-class destroyer built for the Royal Navy during World War II
Sybil Marston (ship), a wooden schooner cargo ship
USS Sibyl (1863), wooden-hull steamer with heavy guns, purchased by the Union Navy during the American Civil War

Other uses
Sybil, a two-handed card flourish created by American magician Chris Kenner
Sybil (cat) (2006–2009), cat living at 11 and 10 Downing Street in the United Kingdom
Sybil attack, the use of stolen or forged multiple identities for defeating a reputation system
 Sibil, another name for Ngalum, a language of New Guinea
 Sibyl System, the primary system that judges individuals the anime Psycho-Pass

See also
 Cybil (disambiguation)
 Sibille (disambiguation)
 Sibylla (disambiguation)
 Sibylle (disambiguation)
 Sybil Vane (disambiguation)
 "The Song of the Sibyl", a Gregorian chant sung on Christmas Eve in Majorca

English feminine given names